010 is the ninth studio album by Japanese band The Mad Capsule Markets. It was released in Japan in 2001 and in the United Kingdom in 2003. The album was much more experimental than the band's previous two albums. It includes a cover of the song "Wardance" by Killing Joke.

Track listing

Personnel 
 Higashi Ishida – Photography
 Kei Kusama – Programming
 Kyono – Vocals
 Mad Capsule Markets – Producer
 Jackie Miles – English Translations
 Motokatsu Miyagami – Drums, Programming
 Katsufumi Tomioka – Visual Design
 Takeshi Ueda – Synthesizer, Bass, Programming, Vocals
 Toru Wada – Design
 Kazushige Yamazaki – Mastering

Charts 

The Mad Capsule Markets albums
2001 albums
Victor Entertainment albums